Sayed Falah Hashim Falah Abdullah is a Bahraini politician and trade unionist. He was sworn into the Council of Representatives on December 12, 2018, representing the Fifth District of the Northern Governorate.

Biography
He served as President of the Al Hidd Energy Syndicate for a time. He was promoted from Assistant Secretary-General for Social Protection to Deputy Secretary-General of the Progressive Democratic Tribune (Al-Minbar), a leading left-wing party in Bahraini politics.

Council of Representatives
In the 2018 Bahraini general election, Hashim ran for office in the Fifth District of the Northern Governorate on behalf of Al-Minbar. He won 470 votes for 11.24% of the vote in the first round on November 24, leading to a runoff on December 2, in which he defeated his rival Ahmad Youssef by winning 1,417 votes for 51.79%.

References

Members of the Council of Representatives (Bahrain)
Bahraini Shia Muslims
Bahraini left-wing activists
Progressive Democratic Tribune politicians
Year of birth missing (living people)
Living people